One Lie Fits All is the third studio album by British metal band One Minute Silence, released on 7 July 2003. Produced by John Leckie, it was the band's last album before they announced their break-up in October 2003, and never enjoyed a supporting tour unlike the two EPs (Revolution and We Bounce) that were released during the anticipation for the album.

MusicOMH wrote that the album's production style ranked with the best nu metal albums, but that the songs included some weaker material.

Performance 
The album gave One Minute Silence their highest-charting single to date with "I Wear My Skin" reaching number 44 in the UK charts.

Track listing

References 

2003 albums
One Minute Silence albums
Albums produced by John Leckie